Nick Mazzoli (born August 8, 1968) is a retired professional Canadian football wide receiver who played for seven seasons for the Hamilton Tiger-Cats, Ottawa Rough Riders, Edmonton Eskimos, and BC Lions. He was drafted first overall in the 1991 CFL Draft by the Hamilton Tiger-Cats. He played college football for the Simon Fraser Clan.

References

1966 births
Living people
Players of Canadian football from Ontario
Canadian football defensive backs
Sportspeople from Markham, Ontario
Simon Fraser Clan football players
Hamilton Tiger-Cats players
Ottawa Rough Riders players
Edmonton Elks players
BC Lions players